{{Speciesbox
| image = Acrodon bellidiflorus illustration.jpeg
| genus = Acrodon
| species = bellidiflorus
| authority = (L.) N.E.Br.
| synonyms = *Acrodon bellidiflorus var. striatus (Haw.) N.E.Br.
Acrodon bellidiflorus var. viridis (Haw.) N.E.Br.
Acrodon duplessiae (L.Bolus) H.F.Glen
Mesembryanthemum acaule L.
Mesembryanthemum bellidiflorum Dill.
Mesembryanthemum bellidiflorum L.
Mesembryanthemum bellidiflorum var. glaucescens Haw.
Mesembryanthemum bellidiflorum var. striatum Haw.
Mesembryanthemum bellidiflorum var. viride Haw.
Mesembryanthemum bellidifolium L.
Ruschia constricta L.Bolus
Ruschia duplessiae L.Bolus
Ruschia graminea Jacobsen
Ruschia longifolia L.Bolus
Ruschia macrophylla L.Bolus
| synonyms_ref = <ref>{{GBIF |id= 5555077|taxon= Acrodon bellidiflorus' |accessdate=20 January 2023}}</ref>
}}Acrodon bellidiflorus, the common tiptoothfig, is a mesemb species from South Africa.

 Description Acrodon bellidiflorus is a compact succulent perennial plant. It has a woody taproot with fine roots growing off it. This is the only species in its genus where this trait is common 

The deep green leaves are triangular. They have a persistent  that turns black with age. The keel and margins may be smooth or may have three or four flexible teeth with broad bases. The number of teeth may also vary between populations. The eastern populations have short visible internodes. Internodes are not visible in other populations.

There is only a single flower at the tip of each flowering branch. They are present between April and July.

 Distribution and habitat 
This species is endemic to South Africa. It is found growing between McGregor and Bredasdorp and the Klein Karoo. It grows in areas that have renosterveld, coastal fynbos or grassland biomes.

 Taxonomy 
Initially, Acrodon bellidiflorus was the only species in its genus. A closer examination of Ruschia in 1986, however, found that several species shared traits with Acrodon bellidiflorus, resulting in them being moved to the genus Acrodon''.

Conservation 
This species is considered to be of least concern by the South African National Biodiversity Institute.

References 

Plants described in 1927
Flora of South Africa
Succulent plants
bellidiflorus